Forteau Bay is a natural bay on the coast of Labrador in the province of Newfoundland and Labrador, Canada.

References

Bays of Newfoundland and Labrador